Olympia Dukakis (June 20, 1931 – May 1, 2021) was an American actress. She performed in more than 130 stage productions, more than 60 films and in 50 television series. Best known as a screen actress, she started her career in theater. Not long after her arrival in New York City, she won an Obie Award for Best Actress in 1963 for her off-Broadway performance in Bertolt Brecht's Man Equals Man.

She later moved to film acting and won an Academy Award and a Golden Globe, among other accolades, for her performance in Moonstruck (1987). She received another Golden Globe nomination for Sinatra (1992) and Emmy Award nominations for Lucky Day (1991), More Tales of the City (1998) and Joan of Arc (1999). Dukakis's autobiography, Ask Me Again Tomorrow: A Life in Progress, was published in 2003. In 2018, a feature-length documentary about her life, titled Olympia, was released theatrically in the United States.

Early life and education
Olympia Dukakis was born in Lowell, Massachusetts, on June 20, 1931, the daughter of Alexandra "Alec" (née Christos) and Constantine "Costa" S. Dukakis. Her parents were Greek immigrants; her father a refugee from Anatolia and her mother from the Peloponnese. She had a brother named Apollo, six years her junior. As a girl, she dominated in sports and was a three-time New England fencing champion. She contended with pressures within her patriarchal Greek family and around her, "in a neighborhood where ethnic discrimination, particularly against Greeks, was routine."

Dukakis was an alumna of Arlington High School in Arlington, Massachusetts, and was educated at Boston University where she majored in physical therapy, earning a BA, which she made use of when treating patients with polio during the height of the epidemic. She later returned to BU and earned a Master of Fine Arts degree in performing arts.

Career

Stage
Prior to her film career, Dukakis began a decades-long stage life working in 1961 in productions at the Williamstown Summer Theater, in the northwestern corner of Massachusetts. Once out of that corner of New England and hitting the pavement of the Great White Way, it didn't take long for her to be recognized for her talent and skill. In 1963, Dukakis' early life Off-Broadway was rewarded with an Obie Award for Distinguished Performance, as Widow Leocadia Begbick in Man Equals Man (a.k.a., A Man's A Man). But her stage work began across the summer of 1961, in productions at the Williamstown Summer Theatre, she continued to perform there every few years, with her last appearance on that stage occurring in 2003, where she played multiple roles in The Chekov Cycle. By 1963, she had begun her career on screen. Transitioning to a professional life centered in New York City, she performed many times in productions in Central Park at the renowned Delacorte Theater. Returning to Western Massachusetts in 2013 for her last stage performance, she played Mother Courage in Mother Courage and Her Children at Shakespeare & Company, in Lenox, Massachusetts.

With her husband, Louis Zorich, and with other acting couples, she co-founded the Whole Theater Company. The company's first play was Our Town, in 1973. With Dukakis serving as artistic director, the theater rolled out five productions per season for almost two decades. Across that span, productions included the works of Euripides, Eugene O'Neill, Samuel Beckett, Tennessee Williams, Edward Albee, and Lanford Wilson. Among the actors performing with Dukakis and her husband were José Ferrer, Colleen Dewhurst, Blythe Danner, and Samuel L. Jackson.

Dukakis' prolific stage directing credits include many of the classics: Orpheus Descending, The House of Bernarda Alba, Uncle Vanya, and A Touch of the Poet, as well as the more contemporary; One Flew Over the Cuckoo's Nest and Kennedy's Children. She also adapted such plays as "Mother Courage" and The Trojan Women for her Montclair, New Jersey situated theater company. Her Broadway theatre credits include Who's Who in Hell and Social Security. She appeared in Martin Sherman's one-woman play, Rose, entirely a monologue about a woman who survived the Warsaw Ghetto, in London and then on Broadway. For the role, she won the 2000 Outer Critics Circle Awards for Outstanding Solo Performance. Twenty-two years after earning her first Obie, she won her second in 1985, a Ensemble Performance Award, for playing Soot Hudlocke in The Marriage of Bette and Boo.

Screen

Dukakis appeared in a number of films, including Steel Magnolias, Mr. Holland's Opus, Jane Austen's Mafia!, The Thing About My Folks and Moonstruck, for which she won an Oscar for Best Supporting Actress. She also played the role of Anna Madrigal in the Tales of the City television mini-series, which garnered her an Emmy Award nomination, and appeared on Search for Tomorrow as Dr. Barbara Moreno (1983), who romanced Stu Bergman. She appeared as Dolly Sinatra in the mini-series of Frank Sinatra's life (1992).

Moonstruck (1987) was directed by Norman Jewison who predicted Dukakis would receive honors for the role. She believed him after receiving the Academy Award for Best Supporting Actress. In addition to her Oscar, she took the Golden Globe in the same category. The honors compounded as she collected the Los Angeles and New York Film Critics Awards, all in recognition of her talent, some acting improvised, as she delivered a serious while hilarious performance. The role of a no-nonsense matriarch, Rose Castorini, plays off Cher's Best Actress Award-winning role as daughter Loretta. She was nominated for the Canadian Academy Award for The Event (2003) and in the middle of the first decade of the 21st century, her roles included 3 Needles, The Librarian: Return to King Solomon's Mines, In the Land of Women, and Away From Her, the 2006 film which cast her alongside Gordon Pinsent as the spouses of two Alzheimer's patients.

She took on powerful roles on the small screen as well. In 1998, she starred as Charlotte Kiszko in the British TV drama A Life for a Life: The True Story of Stefan Kiszko (ITV), based on the actual story of a man wrongfully imprisoned for seventeen years for the murder of a child, Lesley Molseed, after police suppressed evidence of his innocence. In another genre entirely, she provided the voice of Grandpa's love interest for The Simpsons episode "The Old Man and the Key" (2002). In 2000, she played alongside Ian Holm, Judi Dench, Joan Sims (her final acting performance before her death in 2001), and Romola Garai (her first professional role) in the television film The Last of the Blonde Bombshells.

In 2008, Dukakis directed the world premiere production of Todd Logan's "Botanic Garden" at Victory Gardens Theatre in Chicago, Illinois. That same year she starred in the revival of Tennessee Williams' The Milk Train Doesn't Stop Here Anymore, opposite Kevin Anderson at the Hartford Stage, and co-adapted and starred in the world-premiere of Another Side of the Island, based on William Shakespeare's The Tempest, at Alpine Theatre Project in Whitefish, Montana.

In 2011, Dukakis guest-starred on Law & Order: Special Victims Unit. She played the role of Debby Marsh, an attorney. In 2013, she starred in and executive-produced the 2013 film Montana Amazon, co-starring Haley Joel Osment. That same year, on May 24, she was honored with the 2,498th star on the Hollywood Walk of Fame.

In 2018, Dukakis starred in Eleftheromania, which follows an Auschwitz survivor as she recites a true story about a group from the Auschwitz-Birkenau death camp. The following year, Dukakis reprised the role of Anna Madrigal, which she had first played in 1993, in a Netflix update of Armistead Maupin's Tales of The City.

In 2018, Olympia, an American documentary film about her life and career, had its festival premiere at DOC NYC. The film, directed by Harry Mavromichalis, features Whoopi Goldberg, Laura Linney, Ed Asner, Lainie Kazan, Armistead Maupin, Austin Pendleton, Diane Ladd and Dukakis' cousin, Governor Michael Dukakis. It was released theatrically in the United States in July 2020.

Dukakis' final performance is as a judge in the 2021 film Not to Forget.

Personal life

In 1962, Dukakis married fellow Manhattan stage actor Louis Zorich. Planning for a family, they moved out of the city in 1970 to settle in Montclair, New Jersey. It was there they raised their three children: Christina, Peter and Stefan. They had four grandchildren.

In her 2003 autobiography, Ask Me Again Tomorrow: A Life in Progress, Dukakis describes the challenges she faced as a first-generation Greek-American in an area with anti-Greek ethnic bigotry, violence and discrimination; difficulties with her mother and in other relationships; and battles with substances and chronic illness. Her life off the screen and stage was very active. She taught acting for 15 years at NYU and gave master classes for professional theatre universities, colleges and companies across the country. She received the National Arts Club Medal of Honor.

Dukakis became an adherent of Goddess worship, a feminist form of modern Paganism, during a production of The Trojan Women in 1982. From 1989, she was publicly outspoken about this and produced improvised stage performances based on the movement's myths. For 10 years, beginning in 1985, she studied with Indian mentor Srimata Gayatri Devi in the Vedanta school of Hindu philosophy. A strong advocate for women's rights and LGBT rights, including same-sex marriage, Dukakis embraced the roles of a trans landlady in Tales of the City, and a butch lesbian in Cloudburst. She was a figure on the lecture circuit discussing topics such as women living with chronic illness, life in the theater, the environment, and feminism. She is quoted as having said, "I recognize that the real pulse of life is transformation, yet I work in a world dominated by men and the things men value, where transformation is not the coinage. It's not even the language!"

Death
After a period of ill health, Dukakis died under hospice care at her home in Manhattan on May 1, 2021, at the age of 89.

Filmography

Film

Television

References

External links

 
 
 
 
 

1931 births
2021 deaths
20th-century American actresses
21st-century American actresses
Actors from Lowell, Massachusetts
Actresses from Massachusetts
American autobiographers
American film actresses
American modern pagans
American people of Greek descent
American stage actresses
American television actresses
Arlington High School (Massachusetts) alumni
Best Supporting Actress Academy Award winners
Best Supporting Actress Golden Globe (film) winners
Boston University College of Fine Arts alumni
Dukakis family
Massachusetts Democrats
Obie Award recipients
People from Arlington, Massachusetts
People from Manhattan
Women autobiographers
Writers from Lowell, Massachusetts